Scaphokogia is an extinct genus of pygmy sperm whales that lived off the coasts of Mexico and Peru, South America during the Late Miocene to Late Pliocene. Only the type species S. cochlearis has been described. Fossils of Scaphokogia have been found in the Tirabuzon Formation of Baja California and the Pisco Formation of Peru. Scaphokogia existed about 5 million years ago, and were relatively rare animals.

References

External links 
 Scaphokogia at ZipcodeZoo

Sperm whales
Miocene cetaceans
Miocene mammals of South America
Miocene mammals of North America
Pliocene mammals of South America
Montehermosan
Huayquerian
Neogene Peru
Fossils of Peru
Pisco Formation
Pliocene mammals of North America
Blancan
Neogene Mexico
Fossils of Mexico
Fossil taxa described in 1988